Wigan Athletic Football Club was founded in 1932 and joined the Football League in 1978.  The team played in the Premier League for the first time in 2005–06. The table details the club's achievements in all first team competitions, and records their top goalscorer, for each completed season.

Seasons

Key

Key to league record:
 P = Played
 W = Games won
 D = Games drawn
 L = Games lost
 F = Goals for
 A = Goals against
 Pts = Points
 Pos = Final position

Key to divisions:
 CHES = Cheshire County League
 LAN C-1 = Lancashire Combination
 NPL = Northern Premier League
 Div 1 = Football League First Division
 Div 2 = Football League Second Division
 Div 3 = Football League Third Division
 Div 4 = Football League Fourth Division
 Prem = Premier League
 Champ = The Championship

Key to rounds:
 DNE = Did not enter
 Grp = Group stage
 2Q = Second qualifying round
 3Q = Third qualifying round
 4Q = Fourth qualifying round
 R1 = Round 1
 R2 = Round 2
 R3 = Round 3
 R4 = Round 4
 R5 = Round 5

 QF = Quarter-finals
 SF = Semi-finals
 ASF = Area semi-finals
 AF = Area final
 RU = Runners-up
 WS = Shared
 W = Winners

Divisions in bold indicate a change in division.
Players in bold indicate the top scorer in the division that season.

Footnotes

References
 Wigan Athletic – Honours
 
 YOTAC Latics A-Z

Seasons
 
Wigan Athletic